SM UB-127 was a German Type UB III submarine or U-boat in the German Imperial Navy during World War I. She was commissioned into the German Imperial Navy on 1 June 1918 as SM UB-127.

UB-127 was lost at the North Sea Mine Barrage in September 1918.

Construction

She was built by AG Weser of Bremen and following just under a year of construction, launched at Bremen on 27 April 1918. UB-127 was commissioned later the same year under the command of Oblt.z.S. Walter Scheffler. Like all Type UB III submarines, UB-127 carried 10 torpedoes and was armed with a  deck gun. UB-127 had a displacement of  while surfaced and  when submerged. Her engines enabled her to travel at  when surfaced and  when submerged.

References

Notes

Citations

Bibliography 

 

German Type UB III submarines
World War I submarines of Germany
U-boats commissioned in 1918
1918 ships
Ships built in Bremen (state)
U-boats sunk in 1918
U-boats sunk by mines
World War I shipwrecks in the North Sea
Ships lost with all hands
Maritime incidents in 1918